Pijush Hazarika is a Bharatiya Janata Party politician from Assam. He has been a member of Assam legislative assembly since 2011. He was elected in Assam Legislative Assembly election in 2011 from Raha constituency and in 2016 and 2021 from Jagiroad constituency.

Personal life 
Pijush Hazarika was born at Ahutguri, Morigaon located in the Nagaon district of Assam to Late Shisuram Hazarika and Pramila Hazarika. Hazarika did Bachelor of Arts  from Arya Vidyapeeth College in Guwahati.

On 1 October 2011, Hazarika married actress Aimee Baruah. He is the father of two children.

Controversy

 An audio clip of Minister Pijush Hazarika has gone viral where the minister was found threatening a journalist of the news channel Pratidin Time for airing a news report related to his wife Aimee Baruah.
 Pijush Hazarika, the minister for water resources and public affairs, responded to claims that Himanta Biswa Sarma's family was involved in corrupt activities during the COVID era.
 Pijush Hazarika, a cabinet minister for Assam, strenuously objected to the construction of the Miya Museum in the Goalpara district, saying that doing so amounted to plundering Assamese culture.

References

External links 

 Official Twitter Account
 Official Facebook Page

Living people
Bharatiya Janata Party politicians from Assam
Assam MLAs 2016–2021
People from Morigaon district
1977 births
Assam MLAs 2021–2026